Northern Tier may refer to:

Northern Tier (Pennsylvania), five northern counties in Pennsylvania
Northern Tier (United States), the northernmost confine of the lower 48 United States
Northern Tier National High Adventure Bases, of the Boy Scouts of America
 Northern Tier Energy, an American business partnership created in 2010
 Northern Tier, a Cold War term from 1955–1979 for the four Middle Eastern members of the Baghdad Pact, also known as the Central Treaty Organization: Turkey, Iraq, Iran and Pakistan.